Pasdaran (meaning "Guards") can refer to:
 Pasdaran (district) in Tehran
 Informal name for the Army of the Guardians of the Islamic Revolution (Islamic Revolutionary Guard Corps)